Charm City FC was an American soccer team based in Gambrills, Maryland, United States and was founded in 2007.

The team plays its home games in the athletic stadium on the campus of Arundel High School, where they have played since 2009. The team's colors are orange, silver and white.

The team formerly played at the Harford Community College's venue in Bel Air, when they were known as Maryland United FC.

History

Charm City FC began as a member of the Maryland Major Soccer League (MMSL) in 2003 under the name Allied SC. In 2007, they merged with Christos FC and became AC United, but that partnership only lasted one year. After they split, the club joined the National Premier Soccer League (NPSL), replacing Maryland United and changing their name from Allied SC to Charm City FC. They would spend two seasons in the league (2007–08), while continuing to play in the MMSL simultaneously. Before the 2009 season, they left the NPSL to focus on the Maryland state cups and the MMSL.

Year-by-year

Head coaches
  James Oman (2008)
  Jason Rims (2009–present)

Stadia
 Stadium at Harford Community College; Bel Air, Maryland (2008)
 Stadium at Arundel High School; Gambrills, Maryland (2009–present)
 Stadium at Meade Senior High School; Fort Meade, Maryland 1 game (2009)

Logos

External links

National Premier Soccer League teams
Soccer clubs in Maryland
2007 establishments in Maryland